Lajinha is a municipality in the northeastern part of the state of Minas Gerais, Brazil. The population is 19,918 (2020 est.) in an area of 431.92 km². The town borders the state Espirito Santo to the east.

Neighboring municipalities

Chalé
Ibatiba
Mutum
Iúna

Population history

References

External links

 http://www.citybrazil.com.br/mg/lajinha/

Municipalities in Minas Gerais